Les Monos is a French television drama and comedy series which premiered in France in 1999

Synopsis
Monoskiing is two experienced teachers who help teenagers in trouble by organizing practice during scholastic vacation. Every episode is opportunity to tell the often eventful training period of a group of some young persons in different corners of France

Cast

 Christian Rauth : Manu (1999-2001 2003)
 Daniel Rialet : JP (1999-2001 2003)
 Jonathan Tiecoura : Diouk (1999-2004)
 Thierry Redler : Luc (2002-2003)
 Eric Métayer : Loïc (2002-2003)
 Jean-Claude Adelin : Ben (2004)
 Marc Duret : Lino (2004)
 Éva Darlan : Margot (1999-2001)
 Valérie Vogt : The Mayor (2002)

References

France Télévisions television dramas
France Télévisions television comedy
1999 French television series debuts
2004 French television series endings